Larkspur is a city in Marin County, California, United States. As of the 2020 Census, the city's population was  
13,064. Larkspur's Police Department is shared with that of the neighboring Corte Madera and town of San Anselmo as the Central Marin Police Authority. Intersecting Larkspur's downtown is Madrone Canyon, a residential area amidst a redwood grove.

Geography

History
Charles W. Wright laid out the town in 1887. The first post office opened in 1891. Larkspur incorporated in 1908.
Larkspur's Downtown Historic District, known also as Old Downtown Larkspur, is a historic district that was listed on the National Register of Historic Places in 1982.  The restored Art Deco Lark Theater is part of this downtown district.

Communities
Murray Park is an unincorporated community in Larkspur.
Escalle is named after a 19th century French immigrant.

In popular culture
Scenes in the 1949 film noir Impact featured several areas around Larkspur, including the home and gas station of the Probert family, in the location now occupied by Perry's Larkspur restaurant. In the film, the town is frequently mentioned as being in Idaho.

The final scenes of Clint Eastwood's 1971 movie Dirty Harry were filmed in Larkspur at the old Hutchison Gravel Quarry (now Larkspur Landing).

Notable people
Jake Curhan (born 1998), American football offensive tackle for the Seattle Seahawks of the National Football League (NFL)
Matt Doyle, Broadway actor.
Leonard Gardner, author of the novel Fat City, lives in Larkspur.
Erin Gray, television actress.
Janis Joplin's last known residence was located in Larkspur at 380 West Baltimore Avenue.
Charles S. Kilburn, U.S. Army brigadier general
Ki Longfellow grew up in Larkspur's Madrone Canyon: 201 Madrone Avenue, (The Illustrated Vivian Stanshall, a Fairytale of Grimm Art, Eio Books, 2018)
Gavin Newsom, California Governor, lived in Larkspur in his youth.
Steve Perry, former lead singer of rock band Journey.
Michael Savage, conservative broadcaster.
Leon Uris wrote his acclaimed first novel, Battle Cry (1953), in Larkspur.  
Corinne West, singer/songwriter.

Government

Federal and state
From 2008 to 2012, Huffman represented Marin County in the California State Assembly.

In the California State Legislature, Larkspur is in:
  
  .

According to the California Secretary of State, as of February 10, 2019, Larkspur has 8,871 registered voters. Of those, 4,944 (55.7%) are registered Democrats, 1,250 (14.1%) are registered Republicans, and 2,324 (26.2%) have declined to state a political party.

Demographics

2010
At the 2010 census Larkspur had a population of 11,926. The racial makeup of Larkspur was 10,311 (86.5%) White, 186 (1.6%) African American, 26 (0.2%) Native American, 563 (4.7%) Asian, 13 (0.1%) Pacific Islander, 343 (2.9%) from other races, and 484 (4.1%) from two or more races. Hispanic or Latino of any race were 918 people (7.7%).

The census reported that 11,803 people (99.0% of the population) lived in households, 42 (0.4%) lived in non-institutionalized group quarters, and 81 (0.7%) were institutionalized.

There were 5,908 households, 1,314 (22.2%) had children under the age of 18 living in them, 2,266 (38.4%) were opposite-sex married couples living together, 433 (7.3%) had a female householder with no husband present, 197 (3.3%) had a male householder with no wife present.  There were 329 (5.6%) unmarried opposite-sex partnerships, and 74 (1.3%) same-sex married couples or partnerships. 2,502 households (42.3%) were one person and 1,009 (17.1%) had someone living alone who was 65 or older. The average household size was 2.00.  There were 2,896 families (49.0% of households); the average family size was 2.77.

The age distribution was 2,176 people (18.2%) under the age of 18, 466 people (3.9%) aged 18 to 24, 2,620 people (22.0%) aged 25 to 44, 4,103 people (34.4%) aged 45 to 64, and 2,561 people (21.5%) who were 65 or older.  The median age was 48.5 years. For every 100 females, there were 81.9 males.  For every 100 females age 18 and over, there were 78.0 males.

There were 6,376 housing units at an average density of 1,966.1 per square mile, of the occupied units 2,898 (49.1%) were owner-occupied and 3,010 (50.9%) were rented. The homeowner vacancy rate was 1.5%; the rental vacancy rate was 7.1%.  6,494 people (54.5% of the population) lived in owner-occupied housing units and 5,309 people (44.5%) lived in rental housing units.

2000
At the 2000 census there were 12,014 people in 6,142 households, including 2,899 families, in the city. The racial makeup of the city in 2010 was 82.1% non-Hispanic White, 1.5% non-Hispanic African American, 0.1% Native American, 4.7% Asian, 0.1% Pacific Islander, 0.6% from other races, and 3.2% from two or more races. Hispanic or Latino of any race were 7.7%.

Of the 6,142 households 19.2% had children under the age of 18 living with them, 38.4% were married couples living together, 6.3% had a female householder with no husband present, and 52.8% were non-families. 43.1% of households were one person and 14.7% were one person aged 65 or older.  The average household size was 1.93 and the average family size was 2.69.

The age distribution was 16.4% under the age of 18, 3.3% from 18 to 24, 28.8% from 25 to 44, 31.8% from 45 to 64, and 19.7% 65 or older.  The median age was 46 years. For every 100 females, there were 82.7 males.  For every 100 females age 18 and over, there were 78.8 males.

The median household income was $66,710 and the median family income  was $104,028. Males had a median income of $83,252 versus $49,421 for females. The per capita income for the city was $56,983.  About 1.8% of families and 3.7% of the population were below the poverty line, including 2.3% of those under age 18 and 2.9% of those age 65 or over.

Transportation

Ferry service

Larkspur is the location for one of Golden Gate Transit's Larkspur Landing, the main ferry terminal for its commuter passenger ferry service between Marin County and the San Francisco Ferry Building and job centers in the Financial District. This Golden Gate Ferry portals and has a ridership of over 8,500 per day, on average. There is special direct ferry service from the Larkspur Ferry Terminal to AT&T Park for San Francisco Giants games. Parking at the ferry terminal regularly exceeds capacity and there are currently free parking shuttles to nearby areas to serve riders.

Rail service
The Sonoma–Marin Area Rail Transit commuter rail service was extended to Larkspur station in 2019. The line provides daily trips as far north as Charles M. Schulz–Sonoma County Airport and is eventually planned to extend to Cloverdale station.

The North Pacific Coast Railroad (later absorbed by the Northwestern Pacific Railroad) provided interurban services to Larkspur until 1941.

Education
Larkspur-Corte Madera School District serves Larkspur for elementary and middle school. Neil Cummins Elementary School and Hall Middle School serve both Corte Madera and Larkspur. Neil Cummins serves grades K to 5, while Hall serves grades 6 to 8.  The former San Clemente Elementary School has been reopened as The Cove School.  In lieu of extensive retrofit to the existing structures, new buildings have been built on the same site.   This school will serve neighborhoods currently served by Neil Cummins Elementary, mostly to the west of Highway 101, and new developments in the area.

The Tamalpais Union High School District comprises five high schools that serve the region.

Town twinning
  Corte Madera, California ("twin city")
  Shangyu, Zhejiang, China (sister city)

Gallery

See also

Larkspur Landing
List of people from Marin County, California

References

External links

Larkspur, California home page

 
Cities in Marin County, California
Populated places established in 1887
1887 establishments in California
Cities in the San Francisco Bay Area
Incorporated cities and towns in California